Psilocybe fasciata is a species of fungus belonging to the psychedelic Psilocybe genus. It was first documented in 1957 by Japanese mycologist Tsuguo Hongo. It was found growing at the outskirts of a bamboo forest in Japan.

References 

fasciata
Fungi of Japan
Fungi described in 1957